Guilty is a 2020 Indian Hindi-language thriller drama film directed by Ruchi Narain and written by Ruchi Narain, Kanika Dhillon and Atika Chohan. Starring Kiara Advani, the film follows the story of a songwriter whose boyfriend is accused of rape during the era of #MeToo. The film is the first production venture of Dharmatic, the digital arm of Karan Johar's Dharma Productions. It was released on 6 March 2020 on Netflix.

Plot
Nanki Duttaa a badass , songwriter having a group of friends  finds herself in a dilemma when Tanu Kumar, a new student in her university who has a crush on VJ , joins in the #MeToo movement accusing Vijay "VJ" Pratap Singh, Nanki's boyfriend and son of a politician, of having raped her on the night of Valentine's 2018 on Twitter . Nanki attempts to help Vijay by consulting Danish Ali Baig, the lawyer investigating VJ's side of the story. Throughout the movie, we experience Nanki's frequent panic attacks and hallucinations based on the recent incident. Later on in the movie, Danish wins the case and Vijay is released much to Tanu's dismay. VJ tells nanki that he has Cheated on her by sleeping with tanu ,  but not raped her .  However, Nanki remains suspicious due to inconsistencies with the case. During a festival held at the campus, Tanu explains every detail of what happened during the fateful night while exposing her true intentions and feeling towards Vijay. Nanki deduces Tanu's #MeToo tweet and ties every loose end cited throughout the film and comes to the realization that Tanu told the truth all along that Vijay is actually a demon and raped tanu brutally when his ego gets hurt .  A betrayed Vijay is arrested by local authorities. Soon after, Nanki gains the courage to share her own experience with sexual abuse/ rape, when she was 13 years old and encouraged by a relieved Tanu.

Cast
 Kiara Advani as Nanki Dutta : VJ's Girlfriend
 Janya Joshi as Young Nanki
 Akansha Ranjan Kapoor as Tanu Kumar : The Girl Raped By VJ.
 Gurfateh Pirzada as Vijay "VJ" Pratap Singh : Nanki's Cheater Boyfriend and Tanu's rapist and Crush.
 Taher Shabbir as Danish Ali Baig : VJ's Lawyer 
 Tenzin Dalha as Tashi
 Dalip Tahil as Lawyer Mirchandani
 Kunal Vijaykar as Dr. Roy : Nanki's Doctor
 Niki Aneja Walia as Sushma Singh
 Manu Rishi as Pratap Singh, Vijay's father
 Fahad Ali as Rahul Jha
 Rohan Arora as Kerbie
 Deepanshu Titoriya as Deepak
 Sahil Mehta as Arnab Mitra
 Ashish Khanna as Hardy : VJ's friend 
 Gehna Seth as Professor
 Chayan Chopra as KP

Production
In June 2019, a report from Filmfare stated Kiara Advani signing a new project for Dharmatic Entertainment, the digital arm of Karan Johar's Dharma Productions, titled Guilty which was helmed by Ruchi Narain. The principal photography of the film began in Delhi in June 2019 and completed within 33 days.

Soundtrack 

The film score and soundtrack is composed by Ankur Tewari with lyrics written by Kausar Munir.

References

External links

Indian direct-to-video films
Hindi-language Netflix original films
Films about rape in India
Indian thriller drama films
2020 thriller drama films
2020 direct-to-video films
2020 films
2020s Hindi-language films
Hindi-language drama films
Films directed by Ruchi Narain